Somwarpet may refer to:

Places 
 Somwarpet, town in the state of Karnataka, in southern India.
 Somwarpet taluk